The 2006–07 Omani League was the 31st edition of the top football league in Oman. It began on 13 October 2006 and finished on 3 May 2007. Muscat Club were the defending champions, having won the previous 2005–06 Omani League season. On Thursday, 3 May 2007, Al-Nahda Club won 1-0 away in their final league match against Mjees SC and emerged as the champions of the 2006–07 Omani League with a total of 43 points.

Teams
This season the league had 12 teams. Al-Suwaiq Club and Oman Club were relegated to the Second Division League after finishing in the relegation zone in the 2005–06 season. The two relegated teams were replaced by Second Division League teams Al-Khaboura SC and Al-Salam SC.

Stadia and locations

League table

Results

Season statistics

Top scorers

Media coverage

See also
2006 Sultan Qaboos Cup

References

Top level Omani football league seasons
1
Oman